Marja Pärssinen (born 13 March 1971 in Jyväskylä, Finland) is a retired female butterfly and freestyle swimmer from Finland. Nicknamed Marde Pärssinen competed for her native country at three consecutive Summer Olympics, starting in 1992 in Barcelona, Spain. Her best result was a 14th place with the women's 4×100 m medley relay team at the 1996 Summer Olympics, alongside Mia Hagman, Minna Salmela, and Anu Koivisto.

External links
 

1971 births
Living people
Finnish female butterfly swimmers
Finnish female freestyle swimmers
Swimmers at the 1992 Summer Olympics
Swimmers at the 1996 Summer Olympics
Swimmers at the 2000 Summer Olympics
Olympic swimmers of Finland
Sportspeople from Jyväskylä
20th-century Finnish women
21st-century Finnish women